Dungeon & Fighter, sometimes abbreviated to DNF, is a series of video games created by Neople, a subsidiary of Nexon. While early games were only developed and published by Neople, Nexon began to publish other entries in the series as well as outsource the development to other companies.

Games

Dungeon & Fighter

Dungeon & Fighter, the first game in the series, was released for Microsoft Windows on August 10, 2005. The game is an online multiplayer side-scrolling beat 'em up that features multiple classes to choose from. The game underwent a name changed when it was localized to other markets. In Japan, the game was renamed to Arad Senki while in the west it was titled Dungeon Fighter Online.

Dungeon Fighter Live: Fall of Hendon Myre
Dungeon Fighter Live: Fall of Hendon Myre was the first spin-off in the series and was released exclusively for the Xbox 360 on July 13, 2012 for the Xbox Live Arcade. The game offered the same gameplay as the original but with some added graphical upgrades to the sprites. It featured online co-op with up to 4 players who could drop in and drop out. The game had 3 playable classes. The game was delisted and removed from the Xbox Live Arcade marketplace in 2015.

Dungeon & Fighter: Spirit
Dungeon & Fighter: Spirit was the first mobile release of the series released in Korea in 2016. The game follows the same formula as the original with the game being a side-scrolling  beat 'em up game but unlike the original game, Dungeon & Fighter: Spirit utilizes 3D graphics instead of 2D sprites for the character models while much of the background was still in 2D. Shortly after its release, the game was shutdown in 2017 in favor of releasing another mobile game in the series. There were plans to launch the game in Japan as Arad Senki Mobile but these were cancelled with the shutdown of the Korean version.

Dungeon & Fighter Mobile
Dungeon & Fighter Mobile is the second mobile entry in the series released on March 24, 2022. Just like previous games, it features the same side-scrolling gameplay but with the same 2D sprite graphics as previous entries. This game serves as a replacement for the previous entry, Dungeon & Fighter: Spirit.

DNF Duel

DNF Duel is a 2.5D fighting game co-developed by Arc System Works, Eighting, and Neople, and published by Nexon. The game was released on Windows, PlayStation 4, and PlayStation 5 on June 28, 2022. Two open betas for PlayStation platforms platforms were hosted prior to release; the first from December 17 to December 20, 2021, and the second from April 1 to April 4, 2022.

Upcoming games

Project BBQ
In 2018, Nexon announced "Project BBQ", the working title for a 3D Dungeon Fighter Online video game. A gameplay video was revealed in December 2018, demonstrating fast 3D action combat.
A second trailer for "Project BBQ" was released in December 2020.

Overkill
In April 2021, the upcoming Dungeon Fighter Overkill, also known as Dungeon & Fighter Overkill, was announced. The gameplay uses a 2.5D perspective and runs on the Unreal Engine 4.

Other media

Anime
An anime adaption of the game was announced by Gonzo at the Hangame 2008 Summer Festival event on August 24, 2008. The anime premiered on TV Tokyo on April 3, 2009 and ran for 26 episodes. It is loosely based on material from the official webcomic, The Vagrants in Arad (Korean: 아라드의 방랑파티, Japanese: , lit. The Wandering Party of Arad), and features several of the same characters.

A new anime adaptation tittled "Reversal of Fate S2" was announced on September 27, 2018. The series is produced by Liden Films, directed by Noriyuki Abe, and is written by Mayori Sekijima and Aoi Akashiro. The series was set to premiere in 2019, but was delayed until its premiere on April 23, 2020.

Main voice cast:
 Takashi Kondō as Baron Abel
 Sakura Nogawa as Ryunmei Ranka
 Kenichi Suzumura as Capensis
 Ayumi Tsuji as Ixia Jun
 Takaya Kuroda as Jeda Raxpa
 Ryōtarō Okiayu as Irbek
 Rie Tanaka as Hiria
 Mitsuo Iwata as Harsen
 Akeno Watanabe as Roxy
 Shiro Tsubuyaki as Willy

The first opening theme of the anime, "Party Play" by Sakura Nogawa, and the ending theme  by YMCK were used from episodes 1 to 13. From episodes 14 to 26,  by Sakura Nogawa was the opening theme while "LEVEL∞" by Akiko Hasegawa became the ending theme from episodes 14 to 25.

Donghua
A donghua directed by Masahiro Hosoda and animated by Dangun Pictures premiered in 2017.

Manga
A manga based on the game titled , written and illustrated by Kiku Ueda was announced on April 30, 2009. It premiered on May 30, 2009 in the June issue of Gentosha's Monthly Comic Birz magazine.

References

External links
  

 
Active massively multiplayer online games
Video game franchises
Video game franchises introduced in 2005
Nexon franchises
Role-playing video games
2009 manga
2009 anime television series debuts
2017 anime ONAs
2020 anime ONAs
Anime series
Gentosha manga
Gonzo (company)
Liden Films
Manga series
Seinen manga